Jamaran is the lead ship of the Iranian  launched in early 2010 in Bandar-e-Abbas, Iran. Iran has stated that the design and building of Jamaran was among the greatest achievements of the Iranian Navy and the ship's launch marks a major technological leap for Iran's naval industries. More ships in its class are under construction to be added to the Iranian fleets in the Caspian Sea and the Persian Gulf. The ship is designed for a crew of 140. Jamaran combines anti-submarine assets with other systems of weapons capable of dealing with surface and air threats as well.

Description

Weapons systems

The primary weapon deployed by Moudge-class vessels is the Sikorsky SH-3 Sea King, which acts in concert with shipboard sensors to seek out and destroy submarines at long range. The Moudge class also carries a close-in anti-submarine torpedo system, a  light torpedo with a  range, mounted in triple torpedo launchers on either side of the stern.

To deal with surface forces, the vessel is equipped with four Noor / C-802 surface-to-surface anti-ship cruise missiles, mounted in box launchers on the roof of the upper deck level between the radar and the main mast pointing towards either sides.

For anti-aircraft self-defense the Moudge class has four medium range Fajr surface-to-air missiles (reversed engineered from the RIM-66/SM-1 standard missile) with  range, and  flight ceiling, mounted in box launchers at the deck above the main deck level in front of the helicopter landing pad. The Moudge class also carries two 20 mm gunner-operated Oerlikon cannons and a 40 mm Fateh-40 autocannon (reverse engineered from Bofors L/70) with  aerial range, to provide a shipboard point-defense against incoming anti-ship missiles and aircraft.

The main gun on the forecastle is a  Fajr-27 gun. The gun is capable of firing at a rate of 85 rounds per minute at a range of more than 17 kilometers towards surface targets and  towards aerial targets. The Fajr-27 is a multi-purpose weapon, capable of dealing with surface, air, and onshore targets. Jamaran has room on the roof of the upper deck level for installing two 0.50 calibre machine guns in the future.

Countermeasures
Jamaran possesses chaff and flare systems and electronic warfare capabilities.

Sensors & equipment

The ship is equipped with one Asr passive electronically scanned array long-range radar for air and surface search and tracking, installed on the roof of forward of the funnel. The ship is also fitted with two navigation radars on the mainmast. The ship is equipped with one fire control radar.

The ship's equipment in detail are: S and X band radars, tactical aviation radar, radar processor and fire-control systems, subsurface sonar and echo sounder, surface and subsurface communication & internal communication and computer network systems, ECM, ECCM, and navigation systems, electroptical and stabilizer and synchronizer systems, alert system against chemical-microbial attacks and doors and air conditioning system with impenetrability and resistance capability during these attacks, Automated navigation system and some other systems.

Propulsion

The Moudge-class vessels are powered by two  engines, and uses four diesel generators which each generate .

Helicopter landing platform

Jamaran can accommodate a medium-sized helicopter and can also run a helicopter in-flight refueling (HIFR) operation when a helicopter approaches on the landing platform, which is not necessarily suited for landing operations.

Service history 
On September 1, 2022, the IRIS Jamaran took two Saildrone Explorers that were property of the United States Navy.

According to a statement by the United States Fifth Fleet, two nearby U.S. Navy guided-missile destroyers, the USS Nitze and USS Delbert D. Black, responded quickly.

According to a U.S. defense official who spoke on condition of anonymity, Nitze sent a MH-60R Sea Hawk helicopter ahead to the Iranian ship as the destroyers made their way to intercept. The helicopter crew spotted the Saildrones on the ship's deck, but as they approached, the Iranian crew began to throw tarps on top of them "to try to hide the fact that they had seized these unmanned vessels."

The two destroyers arrived and stayed in the area, speaking with the Iranian ship "to deescalate the situation and recover the seized Saildrones", according to the statement.

The Iranians eventually said that they had been told by their headquarters to return the vessels, the defense official said, but they wanted to wait until the sun came up. The drones were released at 8:00am local time Friday morning.

See also

 List of current ships of the Islamic Republic of Iran Navy

References

External links

Moudge-class frigates
Ships built at Iranian Naval Factories
2007 ships
Frigates of Iran